Ira Eugene Argue (1865 in Victoria County, Canada West – August 5, 1927) was a Canadian politician, businessman and farmer. He was elected to the House of Commons of Canada as a Member of the Unionist Party in the 1917 election to represent the riding of Swift Current—Maple Creek.

External links 
 

1865 births
1927 deaths
Members of the House of Commons of Canada from Saskatchewan
Unionist Party (Canada) MPs